David Peter Ewers (born 3 November 1990) is a Zimbabwean  rugby union player in the Aviva Premiership for the Exeter Chiefs. He previously played for the Cornish Pirates in the Championship on a dual registration. He is capable of playing both Flanker and Number 8. Ewers is known for his destructive ball carrying, and exceptional defensive capabilities.

Early life
Ewers attended Hillcrest Preparatory School in Mutare, before his family left Zimbabwe when he was 13, returning to his English grandparents in Ivybridge. His father was a teacher and working on a farm at the time.

Ewers attended the AASE programme run by Ivybridge Community College in 2009 and 2010. Ewers was a member of the Ivybridge squad 1st XV which contended the AASE final of 2009 & 2010 and won the North of England 7s Tournament the same year.

Rugby playing career

Club level
Ewers was signed up by the Chiefs in 2010 and made his first start for Exeter in the British and Irish Cup against Newport.

Before becoming a senior member of the Chiefs squad, Ewers was dual-registered and frequently played for Cornish Pirates.

International level
Ewers was selected for the England squad to face the Barbarians in the summer of 2014. In February 2016 he was called up to England's 2016 Six Nations squad.

References

External links
Premiership Rugby Player Profile
Exeter Chiefs Profile
Cornish Pirates Player Profile

Living people
Zimbabwean people of British descent
Zimbabwean rugby union players
Exeter Chiefs players
1990 births
Sportspeople from Harare
Rugby union number eights